Mitromorpha dormitor is a species of sea snail, a marine gastropod mollusk in the family Mitromorphidae. The length of the shell attains 7.3 mm. This marine species occurs in the Caribbean Sea off Jamaica, Guadeloupe, Curaçao and St Vincent.

References

Further reading
 Sowerby Jr, G. B. "Descriptions of some new species of Columbella, in the collection of H. Cuming, Esp." Proceedings of the Zoological Society of London. 1844.

External links
 
 Petit, R. E. (2009). George Brettingham Sowerby, I, II & III: their conchological publications and molluscan taxa. Zootaxa. 2189: 1–218
 

dormitor
Gastropods described in 1844